Pridham is a surname. Notable people with the surname include:

Andrew Pridham (born 1966), Australian investment banker
Chris Pridham (born 1965), Canadian tennis player
Colby Pridham (born 1987), Canadian ice hockey player
Les Pridham (born 1937), Australian rules footballer
Mackenzie Pridham (born 1990), Canadian soccer player
William Pridham (1841–1919), English-born Canadian drover and politician